A men's chorus or male voice choir (MVC) (German: Männerchor), is a choir consisting of men who sing with either a tenor or bass voice, and whose music is typically arranged into high and low tenors (1st and 2nd tenor), and high and low basses (1st and 2nd bass; or baritone and bass)—and shortened to the letters TTBB. The term can also refer to a piece of music which is performed by such a choir.

Overview
Male voice choirs are commonly found in the United Kingdom, particularly in Wales, Cornwall, and Yorkshire. The names of male voice choirs sometimes use the abbreviation MVC, for example Castleford MVC.

Men have sung together throughout history. In the West, most music lovers will be familiar with monastic chanting such as the Gregorian chant.

In addition, men have come together to make music and enjoy the fellowship of others with a similar passion. Glee clubs became popular in the United States where men would sing in harmony, usually a cappella.  Russia has a long tradition of men singing in the Russian Orthodox Church. Elsewhere in the world, such as in Wales, parts of the US and Europe, male choirs arose from the late 19th century through to present times.

Male choirs (1st tenor, 2nd tenor, baritone and bass) even without trebles or boy sopranos have a slight advantage over women's choirs in that 1st tenors singing in the falsetto range of their voice can extend the range to encompass most of the range available to a female choir.  However, even the lowest female voices cannot extend into the bass range of a men's choir or chorus.  Arguably the most well-known male choruses are those in Wales, but there are highly skilled choirs around the world. Most male choruses today sing a wide range of music, including the traditional Welsh hymns but also choruses from opera, musical comedy and the popular genre.

An unusual offshoot of the male chorus is the barbershop genre. Barbershop singing uses unique and specialised arrangements and is nearly always unaccompanied.

Many of the modern Germany male choruses owe their origins to the  groups which were very popular in the 19th and early 20th centuries, with some groups still singing.

"Männerchor" male voice choirs in Germany
Male voice choirs were an innovation of the 19th century.  Traditional values, with an increasingly patriotic stance and coupled with the social pleasures of a circle of friends stood at the centre of the movement. Older folk songs found new popularity in the first half of the 19th century (Romantic Age). A capella four-voice male voice choirs supplemented the established choral forms of a mix of male, female and children's voices. National musical education was supposed to be promoted along with the political and social Enlightenment. Carl Friedrich Zelter (1758–1832) and above all Friedrich Silcher (1789–1860) were instrumental in influencing the development of a choral life, where choirs took root with a constitution, committee and – in the full flush of enthusiasm – showed all the "bells and whistles" of an organisation. In Switzerland, Hans Georg Nägeli continued this movement.

The choirs often gave themselves evocative names. If an enthusiast had spent a few days at the "golden Rhine", he would feel called on to found a choir on the River Weser with a name such as "Lorelei" or "Stolzenfels". Hoarse male voices called themselves "Harmony" or named their organisation "Concordia", or "The Warbling Nightingale". Such vocal enthusiasm was often bound with patriotism and love of nature. The life of such a club and the joy of singing in harmony was supposed to be especially helpful in diverting attention from a hard day's work.
The musical content, after the initially more political forays, was accordingly: homeland, German forests, songs about the fruit of the grape, and of course – love. Areas which overflow with tourists today were once serenaded as quiet, romantic spots, in songs such as : ("In der Drosselgass“), "Zu Rüdesheim" and "Vater Rhein". In such songs, one would roam as a musician ("Spielmann") or hunter ("Jäger") through the country, and one felt oneself to be as free as a gypsy.

After the Second World War, the survivors found themselves back in their choirs, at first with new members, but the more the dreams of travel and romantic interludes could be actually realised with increasing wealth, the less the members had to seek the experiences about which they sang in thoughts alone. Thus began a gradual decline as the members of the great choirs aged and died and no new members replaced them. Despite this decline, there were still about 9641 male voice choirs in Germany around the year 2002 – about 15.9% of all choral forms.

List of male voice choirs
Notable male voice choirs include:

 The Academic Male Voice Choir of Helsinki
 Australian Welsh Male Choir
 BYU Men's Chorus
 Cardiff Arms Park Male Choir
 Castleford Male Voice Choir
 Choir of the French Army
 Chor Leoni Men's Choir
 City of Bath Male Choir
 Côr Godre'r Aran 
 Cornell University Glee Club
 Felling Male Voice Choir
 Froncysyllte Male Voice Choir
 Gwalia Male Choir
 Holman Climax Male Voice Choir
 Hombourg-Haut Male Voice Choir
 Kenyan Boys Choir
 Leeds Male Voice Choir
 Linköping University Male Voice Choir
 Lund University Male Voice Choir
 Morriston Orpheus Choir
 Orphei Drängar
 Orpheus Male Voice Choir, Grimsby & Cleethorpes
 The Polytech Choir
 Pontarddulais Male Choir
 Svanholm Singers
 Treorchy Male Choir
 Warrington Male Voice Choir
 Wessex Male Choir
 Wiener Schubertbund
 YL Male Voice Choir

See also
 Music of Wales

References

 Directory of Choirs / Uniting English Male Voice Choirs list of English male voice choirs, cotswoldmvc.org

German music
German music history
Choirs
Types of musical groups